Lisa Dale Daniel is an American country music artist. She has recorded one studio album, Luck of Our Own. Daniel is the daughter of songwriter Naomi Martin, whose credits include the Grammy nominated "Let's Take the Long Way Around the World" by Ronnie Milsap and "My Eyes Can Only See as Far as You" by Charley Pride. Daniel and Martin also co-wrote the track "Someone to Call Me Darling" on Lorrie Morgan's 1992 album Watch Me, which also featured Daniel on background vocals.

Daniel made her first recording at age 14, and by 1991, she had joined Moe Bandy's band. Signed to BNA Records (then known as BNA Entertainment) in 1993, she released her Jerry Crutchfield-produced debut album Luck of Our Own in March 1994. The album's two singles did not chart, and Daniel never recorded another album. She has not recorded since, although her debut album's title track was covered on Keith Urban's 1999 self-titled album.

Discography

Albums

Singles

Music videos

References

American country singer-songwriters
Country musicians from Kentucky
Living people
BNA Records artists
Year of birth missing (living people)
Singer-songwriters from Kentucky